Arto Paragamian is a Canadian film director and writer known for Two Thousand and None (2000), Because Why (1993) and Cosmos (1996). As a Concordia University undergraduate, Paragamian won the Norman McLaren Award (at the time the top Canadian student film prize) for two consecutive years with A Fish Story (1987) and Across the Street (1988).

References

External links 
 

1965 births
Living people
Canadian people of Armenian descent
Canadian male screenwriters
Concordia University alumni
Film directors from Montreal
Writers from Montreal
20th-century Canadian screenwriters
21st-century Canadian screenwriters